Grahame Egan (born 8 June 1941) is an Australian former cricketer. He played in six first-class matches for Queensland between 1963 and 1965.

See also
 List of Queensland first-class cricketers

References

External links
 

1941 births
Living people
Australian cricketers
Queensland cricketers
People from Armidale
Cricketers from New South Wales